Herbsheim is a commune in the Bas-Rhin department in Grand Est in north-eastern France.

Geography
The village is positioned to the north-east of Sélestat on the strip of rich alluvial farm land between the main north-south routes and the river Rhine. The village's main street is part of the departmental route D5 which connects Benfeld with the riverbank and the ferry crossing into Germany at Rhinau.

See also
 Communes of the Bas-Rhin department

References

Communes of Bas-Rhin
Bas-Rhin communes articles needing translation from French Wikipedia